Sawan is a district (kecamatan) in the regency of Buleleng in northern Bali, Indonesia. The district is the most important rice-producing area of Bali and employs many local people.

References

Districts of Bali